AS Kunié
AS Lössi
AS Magenta (Nouméa)
AS Mont-Dore
Gaïtcha FCN
Hienghène Sport
JS Baco
Mouli Sport

New Caledonia
 

Football clubs